is the 14th single by SKE48. It was released on March 19, 2014. It debuted in number one on the weekly Oricon Singles Chart. It was the best-selling single in March and the 13th best-selling single of the year in Japan, with 503,917 copies. It debuted in number one on the Billboard Japan Hot 100.

Track listing

TYPE-A

TYPE-B

TYPE-C

TYPE-D

Theater Edition

Members

Mirai to Wa? 
Team S: Anna Ishida, Masana Ona, Yuria Kizaki, Matsui Jurina
Team KII: Mina Oba, Aya Shibata, Akari Suda, Akane Takayanagi, Airi Furukawa, Mizuho Yamada
Team E: Rion Azuma, Madoka Umemoto, Kanon Kimoto, Nao Furuhata, Rena Matsui
Kenkyuusei: Ryoha Kitagawa

Mayflower 
Team S: Anna Ishida
Team KII: Rumi Kato, Akari Suda, Akane Takayanagi, Mai Takeuchi, Haruka Futamura, Airi Furukawa
Team E: Madoka Umemoto, Yukiko Kinoshita

GALAXY of DREAMS 
Team S: Yuria Kizaki, Jurina Matsui
Team KII: Aya Shibata, Akari Suda, Akane Takayanagi, Airi Furukawa
Team E: Kanon Kimoto, Nao Furuhata, Rena Matsui
Kenkyuusei: Ryoha Kitagawa

Neko no Shippo ga Pin to Tatteru you ni 
Team S: Riho Abiru, Anna Ishida, Kyoka Isohara, Yuna Ego, Masana Oya, Yuria Kizaki, Risako Goto, Makiko Saito, Rika Tsuzuki, Aki Deguchi, Yuka Nakanishi, Jurina Matsui, Manatsu Mukaida, Miki Yakata

S-ko to Usohakkenki 
Team KII: Mikoto Uchiyama, Mina Oba, Tomoko Kato, Rumi Kato, Ami Kobayashi, Mieko Sato, Aya Shibata, Akari Suda, Yumana Takagi, Akane Takayanagi, Mai Takeuchi, Haruka Futamura, Airi Furukawa, Rina Matsumoto, Yukari Yamashita, Mizuho Yamada

Machi Awasetai 
Team E: Rion Azuma, Shiori Iguchi, Narumi Ichino, Tsugumi Iwanaga, Madoka Umemoto, Shiori Kaneko, Momona Kito, Yukiko Kinoshita, Kanon Kimoto, Mei Sakai, Nao Furuhata, Rena Matsui, Honoka Mizuno, Ami Miyamae, Reika Yamada

Bokura no Kizuna 
Team S: Riho Abiru, Anna Ishida, Kyoka Isohara, Makiko Saito, Manatsu Mukaida
Team KII: Mikoto Uchiyama, Tomoko Kato, Rumi Kato, Akane Takayanagi, Airi Furukawa, Rina Matsumoto
Team E: Shiori Iguchi, Momona Kito, Reika Yamada

References 

2014 singles
2014 songs
Avex Trax singles
Japanese-language songs
SKE48 songs
Oricon Weekly number-one singles
Billboard Japan Hot 100 number-one singles